is a Japanese football player. She plays for AC Nagano Parceiro. She played for Japan national team.

Club career
Saito was born in Saitama Prefecture on January 12, 1993. She played for TEPCO Mareeze. However, the club was disbanded for Fukushima Daiichi nuclear disaster in 2011. In April 2011, she moved to her local club Urawa Reds. She moved to AC Nagano Parceiro in 2015.

National team career
In October 2008, Saito was selected Japan U-17 national team for 2008 U-17 Women's World Cup. In July 2010, she was selected Japan U-20 national team for 2010 U-20 World Cup. In March 2011, she was selected Japan national team for 2011 Algarve Cup. At this competition, on March 9, she debuted against Sweden.

National team statistics

References

External links

AC Nagano Parceiro

1993 births
Living people
Association football people from Saitama Prefecture
Japanese women's footballers
Japan women's international footballers
Nadeshiko League players
TEPCO Mareeze players
Urawa Red Diamonds Ladies players
AC Nagano Parceiro Ladies players
Women's association football midfielders